"Barting Over" is the eleventh episode of the fourteenth season of the American animated television series The Simpsons, advertised by Fox, and indicated on-screen to be the 300th episode of the show (though in broadcast order, it is the 302nd episode, as noted in the episode proper, and the 301st episode in production order). It originally aired on the Fox network in the United States on February 16, 2003. In this episode, Bart discovers that he used to be a child star in commercials—and that Homer spent all the money he earned. In retaliation, Bart petitions the court to be legally emancipated, and he moves out of the house.

Plot
While Bart and Lisa are cleaning the garage, they find a commercial where Bart is cast as a baby with bad breath. Bart does not remember being a child actor (stating he doesn't remember being in any commercial, before eating a Butterfinger candy bar), and Marge reassures him that he earned a lot of money from it. Homer confesses that he had spent Bart's money. When he asks why Homer would be so selfish in doing so since Marge promised to put that in a trust fund for his future, he explains that he needed the money. Homer had to buy back incriminating photos of himself endangering Bart's life from a hotel balcony to avoid a scandal. Furious, Bart decides that he can no longer live with Homer and appeals to be emancipated.

During the trial, Homer's anger issues prove that Bart is not safe living with him, and Homer is no longer his legal guardian. Furious, he tries to attack Judge Harm, but is stopped by the bailiff and dragged away for contempt.

Bart sadly says goodbye to Marge and Lisa, then moves into a loft. Homer struggles to cope with Bart's disappearance and plans to prove that he can be a better father. That night, Bart is scared away by a rat and runs into the elevator, which takes him to the hangout of Tony Hawk and Blink-182. He befriends Hawk and decorates his loft with luxuries, and when the rest of the family visit him, Bart prefers his new life and still refuses to come back.

Hawk invites Bart to his Skewed Tour, where Homer, Lisa, and Marge follow him. To win back Bart's respect, Homer beats Hawk in a skateboarding duel. After Homer promises that he will never mistreat him again, Bart accepts his apology and moves back in. Homer starts to earn back Bart's money by acting in an advertisement for an impotency drug and which he's embarrassed of. Bart reassures him that no one will remember it in 50 years. On Homer's death 50 years later, an elderly Nelson Muntz laughs at his grave before passing out from the attempt.

Production
FOX insisted that the 300th episode be scheduled specifically on February 16, 2003 so that there was time to plan a huge promotion for the episode. However, the actual 300th episode had already aired two weeks prior. This was referenced in this episode during a joke where Lisa tallies the number of Homer's schemes at 300; Marge comments "I could've sworn it was 302."

Blink-182 recorded their lines for the episode on April 24, 2002; Hawk recorded his five days later on April 29. Mark Hoppus of Blink-182 has stated that being on The Simpsons was "truly one of those “wow, this is unreal” moments that I’ve been lucky enough to experience.  It still makes my day every time I think about it."

Reception
In 2007, Simon Crerar of The Times listed Tony Hawk's performance as one of the thirty-three funniest cameos in the history of the show.

References

External links

The Simpsons (season 14) episodes
2003 American television episodes
Cultural depictions of Tony Hawk
Tony Hawk
Blink-182
Skateboarding mass media
Youth rights
Television episodes written by Andrew Kreisberg